An angle plate is a work holding device used as a fixture in metalworking.

Angle plates are used to hold workpieces square to the table during marking out operations. Adjustable angle plates are also available for workpieces that need to be inclined, usually towards a milling cutter. Angle plates are made from high quality material (generally spheroidal cast iron) that has been stabilized to prevent further movement or distortion. Slotted holes or "T" bolt  slots are machined into the surfaces to enable the secure attachment or clamping of workpieces to the plate, and the plate to the worktable.

See also 
 Lathe faceplate

Machine tools
Metalworking measuring instruments